, (English: Don Giovanni, or The Stone Guest) also known as Don Giovanni Tenorio is a one-act opera (dramma giocoso) by the Italian composer Giuseppe Gazzaniga. The opera was first performed at the Teatro San Moisè, Venice, on 5 February 1787, the same day as  opera Don Giovanni in the same city at the Teatro San Samuele The libretto, by Giovanni Bertati, is based on the legend of Don Juan as told by Tirso de Molina in his play The Trickster of Seville and the Stone Guest (c. 1630), leading to comparisons with Mozart's Don Giovanni which had its premiere later in 1787. Mozart's librettist, Lorenzo Da Ponte, certainly knew the earlier opera. Gazzaniga's work is much shorter than Mozart's, and originally formed part of a double-bill with another piece, Il capriccio drammatico.

Roles
Don Giovanni (tenor) The role was created by Antonio Baglioni, who sang Don Ottavio in the premiere of Mozart's opera.
Pasquariello, Don Giovanni's manservant (bass)
The Commendatore (bass)	
Donna Anna, the Commendatore's daughter (soprano) 	
Duca Ottavio, Donna Anna's fiancé (tenor) 
Donna Elvira, a former lover of Don Giovanni (soprano) 	
Donna Ximena, a lady from Villena (soprano)	
Biagio, a peasant (bass) 	
Maturina, Biagio's fiancée (soprano) 
Lanterna, Don Giovanni's cook (tenor)

Synopsis
With his manservant Pasquariello keeping watch outside, Don Giovanni attempts to seduce Donna Anna. Donna Anna's father, the Commendatore, challenges Giovanni to a duel and is killed. Ottavio, Anna's fiancé, swears vengeance. Meanwhile Don Giovanni encounters his old lover. Donna Elvira, outside the walls of Villena. As Don Giovanni woos Donna Ximena, Pasquariello gives Elvira a detailed account all his master's amorous conquests. Maturina and Biagio, accompanied by a party of peasants, arrive. Maturina and Biagio are about to be married, but Don Giovanni chases off a furious Biagio and attempts (unsuccessfully) to seduce Maturina.

Don Giovanni and Pasquariello follow Ottavio when he visits the Commendatore's tomb. Pasquariello is terrified when he hears the statue accept an invitation to dinner. Later that evening at Don Giovanni's house, Elvira pleads with the Don to mend his ways. She leaves when he refuses. Giovanni and Pasquariello enjoy their dinner and sing the praises of food, wine, and Venetian women. The statue suddenly arrives and drags Don Giovanni to his death. Ottavio and the women enter. Pasquariello and Lanterna describe Giovanni's fate to them. The opera ends as all rejoice at his downfall.

Recordings

Gazzaniga: Don Giovanni – Orchestra e coro della RCA Italiana 
Conductor: Herbert Handt
Principal singers: Laerte Malagutti, Alfonso Nanni, James Loomis, Maria Minetto, Luciana Ticinelli-Fattori
Recording date: 1963
Label: Nuova Era (CD)

Gazzaniga: Don Giovanni – Kammerchor Stuttgart, Tafelmusik Baroque Orchestra
Conductor: Bruno Weil
Principal singers: Douglas Johnson, Luciana Serra, Elżbieta Szmytka, Edith Schmid-Lienbacher, Ferruccio Furlanetto, Carlo Allemanno
Recording date: 1991
Label: Sony Vivarte (CD) SK 46693

SourcesViking Opera Guide'', ed. Amanda Holden (Viking, 1993)

External links
Synopsis and essay on the opera by Jeremy Gray for Bampton Classical Opera

Italian-language operas
Drammi giocosi
1787 operas
Operas
Operas set in Spain
One-act operas
Operas by Giuseppe Gazzaniga
Works based on the Don Juan legend